Miguel Mariz Luís (born 27 February 1999) is a Portuguese professional footballer who plays as a midfielder for Polish club Warta Poznań.

Club career

Sporting CP
Born in Coimbra, Luís joined Sporting CP's youth ranks at the age of 10, from Académica de Coimbra. He made his professional debut in the LigaPro for the reserves on 6 August 2017 on the first day of the season away to S.C. Covilhã as a 72nd-minute substitute for Bubacar Djaló, scoring the 2–1 winner in added time.

On 4 November 2018, under caretaker manager Tiago Fernandes, Luís made his first-team and Primeira Liga debut for the last seconds of a 2–1 away win against C.D. Santa Clara. Four days later, he made a first start and European bow in a goalless draw at Arsenal in the group stage of the UEFA Europa League. On 13 December, in the same competition, he scored a first goal in a 3–0 victory over FC Vorskla Poltava of Ukraine at the Estádio José Alvalade.

Luís scored his first goal in Portugal's top flight on 3 January 2019, in a 2–1 home defeat of Belenenses SAD.

Vitória Guimarães
On 6 October 2020, Luís signed a three-year contract with Vitória S.C. on a free transfer, with the option for a two-year extension. He made 21 competitive appearances during his one-year spell (only five starts), going scoreless in the process.

Raków Częstochowa
Luís joined Raków Częstochowa of the Polish Ekstraklasa on 27 August 2021 on a four-year deal, with Vitória being entitled to 40% of any future transfer (half of that fee belonged to Sporting). He played just one official match during his tenure.

Warta Poznań
On 8 February 2022, Luís was loaned to Warta Poznań in the same country and league alongside teammates Jordan Courtney-Perkins and Daniel Szelągowski. He scored twice on his second game 12 days later, a 3–1 home win over Radomiak Radom.

Luís agreed to a permanent two-year deal on 27 July 2022.

International career
A Portugal international from under-15 level onwards, Luís was part of the under-17 team that won the 2016 UEFA European Championship in Azerbaijan. He scored 5–0 wins over the hosts in the opening game and Austria in the quarter-finals.

At under-19 level, Luís was a European runner-up in 2017 and champion in 2018, netting twice in the group stage in the latter competition in Finland.

Honours
Sporting CP
Taça de Portugal: 2018–19
Taça da Liga: 2018–19

Portugal U19
UEFA European Under-19 Championship: 2018

References

External links

1999 births
Living people
Sportspeople from Coimbra
Portuguese footballers
Association football midfielders
Primeira Liga players
Liga Portugal 2 players
Sporting CP B players
Sporting CP footballers
Vitória S.C. players
Ekstraklasa players
Raków Częstochowa players
Warta Poznań players
Portugal youth international footballers
Portugal under-21 international footballers
Portuguese expatriate footballers
Expatriate footballers in Poland
Portuguese expatriate sportspeople in Poland